Semagystia enigma is a moth in the family Cossidae. It was described by Yakovlev in 2007. It is found in Turkey.

The length of the forewings is about 13.5 mm. The forewings are grey with a dark border. The hindwings are brown with a dark border.

References

Natural History Museum Lepidoptera generic names catalog

Cossinae
Moths described in 2007